Adventure Island: The Beginning, known in Japan as , is a platforming video game released for the Wii's WiiWare service. It was developed and published by Hudson Soft.

Gameplay
The game features gameplay similar to the Nintendo Entertainment System version of Adventure Island, but with a 3D graphics makeover. Players control Master Higgins, running and jumping through levels and dispatching enemies with axes, boomerangs and spears. They must also collect food items in order to maintain a constantly depleting vitality meter. Players can also upgrade their abilities and weapons by finding golden melons and trading them in at a shop on the overworld map.

The game also features four minigames, including skateboarding (that uses the motion sensing of the Wii Remote), axe throwing and a virtual re-creation of Hudson's 16-Shot handheld gaming device, which measures how many button presses a player can achieve in a second.

Reception
Prior to release, the game had been criticized by several reviewers who previewed the game. JC Fletcher from Joystiq criticized the 3D makeover, saying that "we do wish that Hudson had taken the Mega Man 9 route, because the 3D makeover isn't working". Ray Barnholt from 1UP.com noted that the game looked "remarkably similar" to Hudson Selection Adventure Island, the previously released Nintendo GameCube and PlayStation 2 remake of the first game, and felt that the graphics in the remake were "more appealing" than their Adventure Island: The Beginning rendition.
IGN called it "an enjoyable, entertaining update to a classic franchise" but lamented the lack of improvements to the presentation.

References

External links
Official website
Adventure Island: The Beginning at Mobygames

2009 video games
Adventure Island (franchise)
Platform games
Video games developed in Japan
Video games set on fictional islands
WiiWare games
Wii-only games
Wii games
Multiplayer and single-player video games
Hudson Soft games